Anna Maria Hawa is an actress best known for role of Omar's sister in Hany Abu-Assad's film Omar which made the 86th Academy Awards's shortlist for Best Foreign Language Film. and Inheritance.

Filmography
 Omar (2013)
 Inheritance (2012)

References

External links
 
 

Living people
21st-century Palestinian actresses
Year of birth missing (living people)
Palestinian film actresses
Place of birth missing (living people)